Is There Nothing We Could Do? is the sixth studio album by Badly Drawn Boy, released in 2009. It contains music inspired by the television film The Fattest Man in Britain.

Track listing
"Opening Theme" – 1:55
"Is There Nothing We Could Do?" – 3:38
"A Gentle Touch" – 0:27
"All The Trimmings" – 2:11
"Welcome Me To Your World" – 3:41
"Guitar Medley" – 3:31
"Is There Nothing We Could Do? Reprise" – 3:47
"Big Brian Arrives" – 2:29
"Amy In The Garden" – 1:03
"Been There, Verified" – 1:27
"Just Look At Us Now?" – 3:33
"Wider Than A Smile" – 5:07
"Piano Theme" – 2:26
"The Letter" – 3:06
"I'll Carry On" – 3:58

Personnel
 Damon Gough - vocals, guitars, keyboards
 Che Beresford - drums
 Ollie Collins - bass
 Bob Marsh - trumpet, flugelhorn
 Colin Mcleod - Clavichord, effects, cage
 Norman Mcleod - ladders
 Natalie Dudman - violin
 Sinead Fletcher - cello

The Heath Quartet
 Oliver Heath - violin 1
 Natalie Dudman - violin 2
 Gary Pomeroy - viola
 Christopher Murray - cello

References

External links
Is There Nothing We Could Do? Review on the BBC Music website
Is There Nothing We Could Do? Review in The Guardian

Badly Drawn Boy albums
2009 albums